The Rt. Hon. Enid Lawson, Baroness Burnham CBE (née Marie Enid Robson; 27 May 1894 – 29 July 1979) served as the Girl Guide Chief Commissioner for England.

She was born in  Buenos Aires, the only daughter of Hugh Scott Robson, a British-Argentinian polo player, and his wife, Lucy Grigg. She had an older brother, Noel Robson. The family moved back to England in February 1901 and lived with her maternal grandparents. She was educated at Heathfield School in Berkshire. On 28 January 1920, she married Edward Lawson, 4th Baron Burnham. They had two sons and a daughter.

Honours
She was a recipient of the Silver Fish Award, the highest adult award in Girlguiding, awarded for outstanding service to Girlguiding combined with service to world Guiding.

Lady Burnham was appointed Commander of the Order of the British Empire (CBE) in 1957.

Family
Lord and Lady Burnham had three children:
 William Edward Harley Lawson, 5th Baron Burnham (1920–1993)
 Hon Lucia Edith Lawson (29 August 1922 – 24 July 2011), married Roger Marquis, 2nd Earl of Woolton, divorced 1953. Married John William Whitehead in 1966.
 Hugh John Frederick Lawson, 6th Baron Burnham (1931–2005)

References

1894 births
1979 deaths
Commanders of the Order of the British Empire
Girlguiding officials
Recipients of the Silver Fish Award